Cortez A. Broughton (born September 2, 1996) is an American football defensive tackle for the Buffalo Bills of the National Football League (NFL). He played college football at Cincinnati.

Professional career

Los Angeles Chargers
Broughton was drafted by the Los Angeles Chargers (242nd overall pick) in the seventh round of the 2019 NFL Draft. On November 15, 2019, Broughton was placed on the non-football illness list.

On August 31, 2021, Broughton was waived by the Chargers.

Kansas City Chiefs
On September 3, 2021, Broughton was signed to the Kansas City Chiefs practice squad. He signed a reserve/future contract with the Chiefs on February 2, 2022. He was waived on July 27, 2022, after failing a physical. He was re-signed to the practice squad on September 27, 2022. He was released on October 11.

Buffalo Bills
On December 6, 2022, Broughton was signed to the Buffalo Bills practice squad. He signed a reserve/future contract on January 23, 2023.

References

1996 births
Living people
People from Warner Robins, Georgia
Players of American football from Georgia (U.S. state)
American football defensive tackles
Cincinnati Bearcats football players
Los Angeles Chargers players
Kansas City Chiefs players
Buffalo Bills players